Dennis Smith is an American politician and lawyer who served as a member of the Minnesota House of Representatives from 2015 to 2019. A Republican, he represented District 34B in the western Twin Cities metropolitan area. He is currently a candidate for Attorney General of Minnesota in 2022.

Early life
Smith was born in White Bear Lake, Minnesota.

Political  career

Minnesota House of Representatives 
Smith was first elected to the Minnesota House of Representatives in 2014. He served from 2015 to 2019.

2022 Minnesota Attorney General election 
Smith announced his candidacy for the 2022 election to the office of Minnesota Attorney General on 3 June 2021.

Personal life
Dennis is the father of two children and resides in Osseo, Minnesota.

References

External links

Dennis Smith official campaign website

Living people
Members of the Minnesota House of Representatives
21st-century American politicians
People from Maple Grove, Minnesota
Year of birth missing (living people)